Cryptostomata (singular: cryptostoma) are structures found in some types of brown algae.

The anatomical structures are found in some species of Fucus, but not in Pelvetia canaliculata. They are conceptacles, sterile cavities, producing only hairs. They are found on the lamina of Fucus serratus. Colourless tufts of hairs can be seen issuing from them.

They are also sometimes referred to by the German name of Fasergrübchen.

References

Algal anatomy